Frank Johnston Hindle (22 June 1925 – 21 September 2013) was an English footballer, who played as a defender in the Football League for Chester and Bradford Park Avenue. He died in Newton Stewart, Scotland in September 2013 at the age of 88.

References

1925 births
2013 deaths
Association football defenders
Blackburn Rovers F.C. players
Bradford (Park Avenue) A.F.C. players
Chester City F.C. players
English Football League players
English footballers
Footballers from Blackburn